Marko Topić (born 1 January 1976) is a Bosnian retired professional footballer who played as a forward. On the club level, he last played for Russian side Saturn Moscow Oblast, representing Bosnia and Herzegovina internationally.

Club career
Born in Orašje, Bosnia and Herzegovina, Yugoslavia, Topić started his professional career at post-war Croatia in 1994.

In 1998, he was signed by A.C. Milan but sent to Monza in co-ownership deal for 650 million lire (€335,697). He was bought back in June 2001 for 1 billion lire (€516,457). Monza also signed Matteo Pelatti for 400 million lire as compensation.

After Energie Cottbus relegated in 2003, he signed for VfL Wolfsburg.

International career
He made his debut for Bosnia and Herzegovina in a November 1997 friendly match away against Tunisia and has earned a total of 24 caps, scoring 2 goals. His final international was a June 2009 friendly against Oman.

International goals
'Scores and results list Bosnia and Herzegovina's goal tally first.''

Personal life
His family lives in Basel, Switzerland.

Footnotes

References

External links

1976 births
Living people
People from Orašje
Croats of Bosnia and Herzegovina
Association football forwards
Bosnia and Herzegovina footballers
Bosnia and Herzegovina international footballers
GNK Dinamo Zagreb players
FC Sion players
FC Zürich players
FC Wil players
NK Varaždin players
A.C. Monza players
FK Austria Wien players
FC Energie Cottbus players
VfL Wolfsburg players
PFC Krylia Sovetov Samara players
FC Saturn Ramenskoye players
Croatian Football League players
Swiss Super League players
Swiss Challenge League players
Serie B players
Austrian Football Bundesliga players
Bundesliga players
Russian Premier League players
Bosnia and Herzegovina expatriate footballers
Expatriate footballers in Croatia
Bosnia and Herzegovina expatriate sportspeople in Croatia
Expatriate footballers in Switzerland
Bosnia and Herzegovina expatriate sportspeople in Switzerland
Expatriate footballers in Italy
Bosnia and Herzegovina expatriate sportspeople in Italy
Expatriate footballers in Austria
Bosnia and Herzegovina expatriate sportspeople in Austria
Expatriate footballers in Germany
Bosnia and Herzegovina expatriate sportspeople in Germany
Expatriate footballers in Russia
Bosnia and Herzegovina expatriate sportspeople in Russia